SS Edmund Fitzgerald was an American freighter that sank in Lake Superior in 1975.

Edmund Fitzgerald may also refer to:

"The Wreck of the Edmund Fitzgerald", a 1976 song about the shipwreck, by Gordon Lightfoot
Edmund B. Fitzgerald (1926–2013), American businessman, and son of the namesake (1895–1986) of the ship 
The Edmund Fitzgerald (band), a UK math rock group